The women's 400 metres hurdles at the 2004 Summer Olympics as part of the athletics program were held at the Athens Olympic Stadium from August 21 to 25.

The first round had split a full roster of runners into five heats with the first two gaining a direct qualification and then the next six fastest across all heats advancing to the semifinals. The top four runners in both of the semifinal heats moved on directly to the final.

The final was expected to witness four early-season favorites, U.S. top runner Sheena Johnson, 2003 world champion Jana Pittman, current world record holder Yuliya Pechenkina, and two-time European champion Ionela Târlea-Manolache, challenging each other for the Olympic title. Inside the stadium, however, the raucous Greek crowd turned their attention on home favorite Faní Halkiá, who had previously lowered the Olympic record by 0.05 of a second in the second semifinal.  All three medalists came from that semi, fifth place equalling 3rd place in the first semi.

From the start in lane four, Halkia drew level with Pittman outside her at the halfway turn, until she quickly pulled away from the field on the last hundred metres and cleared the final hurdle. With none of the pre-race favorites willing to chase her on the home stretch, Halkia raced comfortably to an Olympic gold. Behind her, Târlea-Manolache and Ukraine's Tetyana Tereshchuk-Antipova came through on the inside to take the silver and bronze medals respectively. Running bravely against a tore knee injury, Pittman managed to finish the race in fifth place, while Pechenkina stumbled behind on a wretched run to round out the field in last.

Halkia's triumph proved to be a redemption for the host nation Greece in track and field, after the anti-doping scandal and suspicious affair on 2000 Olympic medalists and sprinters Kostas Kenteris and Ekaterini Thanou that tainted the start of the Games.

Records
, the existing World and Olympic records were as follows.

The following records were established during the competition:

Qualification
The qualification period for Athletics was 1 January 2003 to 9 August 2004. For the women's 400 metres hurdles, each National Olympic Committee was permitted to enter up to three athletes that had run the race in 55.60 seconds or faster during the qualification period. If an NOC had no athletes that qualified under that standard, one athlete that had run the race in 56.25 seconds or faster could be entered.

Schedule
All times are Greece Standard Time (UTC+2)

Results

Round 1
Qualification rule: The first two finishers in each heat (Q) plus the next six fastest overall runners (q) advanced to the semifinals.

Heat 1

Heat 2

Heat 3

Heat 4

Heat 5

Semifinals
Qualification rule: The first four finishers in each heat (Q) moved on to the final.

Semifinal 1

Semifinal 2

Final

References

External links
 IAAF Athens 2004 Olympic Coverage

W
400 metres hurdles at the Olympics
2004 in women's athletics
Women's events at the 2004 Summer Olympics